Oddbjørn Skartun (born 28 January 1989) is a Norwegian footballer who plays as a forward. He has previously played for Sogndal, Vard Haugesund, Haugesund and Sandnes Ulf.

Career
Skartun was born and raised in Sogndal, and played a total of six matches (five league matches) for the Norwegian First Division side Sogndal IL between 2006 and 2009. In 2009, Skartun moved to Vard Haugesund, and scored 26 goals in three seasons for the team in the Second Division. Ahead of the 2012 season, Skartun signed a contract with Haugesund, where he made nine appearances in Tippeligaen, eight as a substitute. He scored two goals for the first-team in the Norwegian Cup and scored 30 goals for the reserve team in the Third Division. Skartun joined Bryne ahead of the 2013 season, and signed a two-year contract with the club. After scoring six goals in the first ten matches for Bryne in the First Division, Skartun scored two goals when Viking was eliminated in the third round of the 2013 Norwegian Football Cup.

Ahead of the 2018 season, he left Sandnes Ulf and trained for several months with Vard Haugesund, but was reluctant to sign for a third-tier club. He nonetheless did.

Personal life
Skartun is the son of the former Sogndal player Jarle Skartun. His uncles, Gjermund Skartun and Rolf Navarsete did also play for Sogndal.

Career statistics

References

External links
 

1989 births
Living people
People from Sogndal
Norwegian footballers
Sogndal Fotball players
SK Vard Haugesund players
FK Haugesund players
Bryne FK players
Sandnes Ulf players
Norwegian First Division players
Eliteserien players
Association football forwards
Sportspeople from Vestland